Glenbrook is a census-designated place (CDP) on the east shore of Lake Tahoe in Douglas County, Nevada, United States. The population was 215 at the 2010 census. Beach and Bay are for residents and renters living in Glenbrook's gated community. There is no public access to the beach or bay.

Glenbrook is included in the Gardnerville Ranchos micropolitan statistical area.

History

As the oldest settlement on Lake Tahoe, Glenbrook played a significant part of Nevada's statehood as the main supplier of timber to the Comstock Lode and Virginia City. The first settlers of the valley, which included Captain Augustus W. Pray, arrived in 1860. Pray built a sawmill in 1861. The community took its name from the former "Glenbrook House hotel", which in turn was named after two primary local geographic features — Glen, a secluded valley, and Brook, a small stream. From forested areas near the lake, logs were driven down stream or barged to Glenbrook mills. In 1875, the town had four sawmills, a store, bowling alley and billiard hall, two hotels. After 1880, logging activity was in decline and was abandoned by the end of the century.

Geography
Glenbrook is located on the east shore of Lake Tahoe, due west of Carson City.

Four streams enter Lake Tahoe at Glenbrook. These are Glenbrook Creek, Sullivan Springs Creek, North Canyon Creek, and a diversion of Logan House Creek.

Climate
Area has a Köppen Climate Classification of Csb, which is a dry-summer subtropical climate often referred to as "Mediterranean".

Demographics

References

Census-designated places in Douglas County, Nevada
Census-designated places in Nevada
Populated places established in 1860